Jayshree Arora (also spelled Joyshree or Jayshri) is an Indian film, stage and television actress, and a trained dancer of Kathak and Manipuri dance. She starred in the first Indian TV serial Hum Log, which began in 1984 and has since performed in over 160 works.

Filmography

Television

Films

References

External links
 

Living people
Bengali actresses
Actresses from Kolkata
Actresses from Mumbai
20th-century Indian actresses
21st-century Indian actresses
Indian film actresses
Actresses in Hindi cinema
Indian television actresses
Indian soap opera actresses
Actresses in Hindi television
Indian stage actresses
Year of birth missing (living people)